The Lakemba Mosque, also known as the Masjid Ali Bin Abi Talib and officially the Imam Ali bin Abi Taleb Mosque, is Australia's largest mosque. It was the first purpose-built mosque in Sydney and is located at 71-75 Wangee Road, Lakemba. Owned and managed by the Lebanese Muslim Association (LMA), Lakemba Mosque and the LMA offices are situated contiguously at the same address.

History

A small house on the current site of Lakemba Mosque was purchased and used by the Lebanese Muslim Association from the 1960s as a place of worship. The house was demolished in the early 1970s and construction of the current building commenced. Construction lasted five years, with the mosque being completed in 1977. The opening of the mosque was attended by the former Prime Minister Gough Whitlam. Fundraising for the mosque took place both locally and internationally, with about half the funds coming from the Middle East and the largest single donation coming from the Saudi royal family. Lakemba Mosque was the second purpose-built mosque in Sydney and remains arguably Australia's most well-known and important mosque.

While historically Muslims of Lebanese heritage constituted the majority of the congregation, today people of Pakistani, Bangladeshi, Somali and South-East Asian backgrounds also attend in significant numbers, along with a small but growing number of converts. The overwhelming majority of the congregation is either of Hanafi or Shafi'i background.

Controversies

1977 'Holy War' document
During Ramadan celebrations on September 30, 1977, around 4000 copies of a document calling for a "Holy War" (Jihad) was distributed to worshippers at Lakemba mosque. The document stated that Muslims must wage war against foreign interference and to spread Islam. It also made discriminatory references to Christians, Jews, Hindus and others, referring to them as "infidels" that must be fought. Middle Eastern Christian groups such as the Maronites and Copts believed that the document was created by Muslim Brotherhood members active at the mosque.

Taj El-Din Hilaly
Taj El-Din Hilaly, the former Imam of Lakemba Mosque from the 1980s till 2007 (and whose wages were paid by Gaddafi's Libyan Islamic Call Society and private individuals") is known to have made numerous controversial statements.

1988 speech regarding Jews
In 1988 when Hilaly delivered a lecture to a group of Muslim students at University of Sydney on the topic "The Disposition of Jews in the light of the Qur'an." He was quoted as saying:

Hilaly has not since apologised nor retracted his comments, in which he accused Jews of "causing all wars."

February 2004 sermon
In February 2004 Hilaly gave a sermon at a mosque in Sidon, Lebanon, whilst overseas the text of which was translated by the Australian Embassy in Beirut. It appeared to show him supporting terrorist attacks. In his sermon, Hilaly said:

In his speech, he also predicted that Muslims would control the White House and appeared to support Hezbollah. The Australian Federal Police declined to investigate his activities overseas.

2006 Holocaust denial
In July 2006 Hilaly was sacked from Prime Minister of Australia John Howard's Muslim Community Reference Group following comments he made in which he denied the Holocaust, calling it a "Zionist lie". He also referred to Israel as a "cancer". This prompted calls for legal action to be pursued against him in a country which has the highest per-capita number of Holocaust survivors in the world outside Israel.

October 2006 sermon
In October 2006, Hilaly delivered a Ramadan sermon in Arabic in which he made statements concerning female clothing which proved highly controversial. The key part of these was:

He also said, "in the state of zina, the responsibility falls 90 per cent of the time on the woman. Why? Because she possesses the weapon of enticement (igraa)." Hilaly later claimed that he had intended to suggest that "if a woman who shows herself off, she is to blame...but a man should be able to control himself." He also contended that his references to the prison sentence of Bilal Skaf, the leader of a group of Lebanese Australians who committed gang rapes in Sydney in 2000, in which he said that women would "sway suggestively" before men "and then you get a judge without mercy (rahma) and gives you 65 years", were aimed at illustrating the need for harsh sanctions for rape.

There was a significant backlash to Hilaly's comments.

Alleged link to Al-Qaeda
In February 2009, a Sydney Morning Herald journalist was ejected from the Lakemba mosque and the newspaper later reported that Anwar al-Awlaki, a key organizer, recruiter and spiritual motivator for the Islamist terrorist group al-Qaeda, spoke via phone link. A director of the mosque said that Shady Alsuleiman was in charge of organising evening youth events at the time of the sermon.

Alleged sectarianism
In March 2015, adjunct professor Clive Williams at Macquarie University's Centre for Policing, Intelligence & Counter Terrorism wrote that Sunni Muslims did not welcome Shia Muslims at the mosque.

Christmas controversy
In late 2012 Shaykh Safi told the congregation, during prayers, that they should not take part in anything to do with Christmas.  A fatwa warned that, "disbelievers are trying to draw Muslims away from the straight path".  The Grand Mufti of Australia, Ibrahim Abu Mohamed, said these views did not represent the majority of Muslims in Australia. Keysar Trad, former director and president of the LMA, said they previously greeted people with Merry Christmas, "I don't know what has changed."

Mosque personnel
Lakemba Mosque has a number of staff who assist in the running and maintenance of the mosque. Currently the mosque has three official Imams:

The Imam of Lakemba Mosque is Shaykh Yahya Safi, who worked as an Imam in Lebanon before his appointment at the Lakemba Mosque in 1996. Shaykh Yahya gives the khutbah every fortnight, unless there is a visiting Shaykh from overseas.
The assistant Imam as of 2016 is Shaykh Mohammed Gomaa from Egypt. Shaykh Gomaa is a bilingual Imam who was trained at Egypt's prestigious Al-Azhar University. He specialises in Qur'anic Commentary and alternates in giving the Friday sermon each fortnight.
The deputy assistant Imam, as of 2015, is Shaykh Mohamed Harby. Shaykh Mohamed is a qāriʾ from Egypt who specialises in the sciences of Qur'an which he teaches at an advanced level to students at the Lebanese Muslim Association.

Due its influence and significance, the mosque regularly hosts and is a first stop for visiting Islamic scholars from overseas.

Activities
The mosque offers a number of religious classes, such as in prophetic biography, fiqh and aqidah. The mosque gives a platform to a number of local Shaykhs to speak and teach, such as Shaykh Wesam Charkawi. Since 2014, the mosque has served as the centre of the National Mosque Open Day event.

Several thousand worshippers normally attend weekly prayers on Fridays. In 2015 around 30,000 worshippers attended Eid prayers at the mosque and in the road outside, making it one of Australia's largest Eid celebrations. In 2016, an estimated 40,000-50,000 attended Eid prayers.

See also

Islam in Australia
Islamic schools and branches
List of mosques in Oceania

References

Sources

External links
 Lakemba Mosque

Mosques in Sydney
Mosques completed in 1977
1977 establishments in Australia
Sunni Islam in Australia